Deepender Singh Hooda (born 4 January 1978) is an Indian politician and four-term MP from the Indian National Congress, who is the current Member of Parliament, Rajya Sabha representing Haryana. He also served three terms as Member of Parliament in Lok Sabha from Rohtak (2005–2019). He is a special invitee to the Congress Working Committee, the highest decision making body of the Indian National Congress.

In his 15 years as the Rohtak MP, he helped set up an IIM, India's largest cancer institute at Jhajjar, an IIT extension campus,  besides the 5,500 acre IMT, Rohtak which has companies like Maruti Suzuki, Asian Paints, Suzuki Motorcycles and others, attracting an investment of Rs 5,000 crore, besides setting up FDDI and IHM in his constituency. He continues to be engaged in academics and was named a Leader-in-Residence at the Kelley School of Business, Indiana University, Bloomington – its Poling Chair of Business and Government.

He is the fourth generation of his family to be in public service: His father Bhupinder Singh Hooda served as the Chief Minister of Haryana for two terms while his grandfather, Ranbir Singh Hooda, was a freedom fighter, a member of the Constituent Assembly, member of the 1st and 2nd Lok Sabha from Rohtak, and Minister in Punjab (when Haryana was part of Punjab) and a member of Rajya Sabha. His great grandfather Choudhary Matu Ram was a social reformer and a freedom fighter who worked closely with Mahatma Gandhi.

Hooda was the youngest parliamentarian when he entered politics in 2005. He writes frequently on Indian economics and international affairs in the Indian Express and other prominent publications.

Political career
Hooda was elected to the Rajya Sabha in 2020 and was earlier elected to the Lok Sabha from Rohtak for three terms. During the 16th Lok Sabha, he was the Whip of Indian National Congress in Parliament. He also served on several other statutory and parliamentary bodies in various capacities as an elected board member of the Council of Indian Institutes of Technology; as a Member of Parliamentary Standing Committee on Energy; as chairman of Indo-UK forum of Parliamentarians. In past, he has been a member of Parliamentary Standing Committees of Finance, External Affairs, Agriculture and Human Resource Development.

Corporate career
Deepender had worked in various companies in India and the United States, before being elected to the Lok Sabha in 2005, at the age of 27. He started his professional career with Reliance Industries Ltd, (1999- 2000) as a management trainee and then worked as a software engineer with Infosys Technologies Ltd, (2000–2001) at their campus in Bengaluru.

He then took a break to finish his MBA at Kelley School of Business, Indiana University, where he majored in finance and strategy. After his MBA, he joined American Airlines/Sabre Holdings, Dallas, USA as a senior manager (2003–2005). He was offered a job at McKinsey & Company and came to India to take a short break between jobs but then decided to move to public service. He contested and won the Lok Sabha by-election from Rohtak in October, 2005.

Education
Deepender Hooda holds a Bachelor of Technology and Master of Business Administration and a bachelor's degree in law. He did his engineering from the Technological Institute of Textile & Sciences, Bhiwani, then managed by the Birla Education Trust. He did his MBA from Kelley School of Business at the Indiana University, Bloomington, where he majored in Finance and Strategy. At the Indiana University, he was awarded honorary Beta Gamma Sigma (top 1% of class) and was elected president of Asian Students Association at University in a unanimous vote. During this period, he successfully led team of Asian students from the top 15 business schools in United States in holding `Asian Business Conference` at Harvard Business School.

He holds a law degree from the prestigious Campus Law Centre, Faculty of Law,  University of Delhi (2016–17 to 2019–20).

He attended school at Mayo College, Ajmer, Delhi Public School, RK Puram and Model School, Rohtak.

Awards
World Economic Forum's Young Global Leader (YGL): He was named as a Young Global Leader in the year 2011.

MIT's Bharat Asmita Jana Pratinidhi Shreshta award: In 2010 he received Bharat Asmita Jana Pratinidhi Shreshta award for the best young exponent of parliamentary practices for his work towards rural development through education and power generation. He received the Shresth Sansad Award in 2019

Personal life
Deepender Hooda married Sweta Mirdha, grand daughter of Nathuram Mirdha who is a member of the Indian National Congress in Rajasthan. Her older sister, Jyoti Mirdha, is a former Congress MP from Nagaur in Rajasthan. Jyoti Mirdha is married to Narendra Gehlaut-Vice Chairman Indiabulls Real Estate. Sweta and Deepender have a young son Kesarbir who has started school.

Hooda was earlier married to Geeta Grewal, they divorced in 2005.

See also
 Dynastic politics of Haryana

References

1978 births
Living people
Indian National Congress politicians
India MPs 2004–2009
India MPs 2009–2014
People from Rohtak
Lok Sabha members from Haryana
India MPs 2014–2019